Bona is a village in Safané Department, Mouhoun Province, Burkina Faso.

Bona has a population of 1,143.

See also
 Bona (Lena), Burkina Faso

References

Mouhoun Province
Populated places in the Boucle du Mouhoun Region